The 2015–16 Rutgers Scarlet Knights women's basketball team will represent Rutgers University during the 2015–16 NCAA Division I women's basketball season. The Scarlet Knights, led by twenty-first year head coach C. Vivian Stringer, play their home games at the Louis Brown Athletic Center, better known as The RAC, as second year members of the Big Ten Conference. They finished the season 19–15, 8–10 in Big Ten play to finish in a tie for ninth place. They advanced to the quarterfinals of the Big Ten women's tournament where they lost to Ohio State. They were invited to the Women's National Invitation Tournament where they defeated Georgetown in the first round before losing to Virginia in the second round.

Roster

Schedule

|-
!colspan=9 style="background:#CC0000; color:#FFFFFF;"| Non-conference regular season

|-
!colspan=9 style="background:#CC0000; color:#FFFFFF;"| Big Ten regular season

|-
!colspan=9 style="background:#CC0000; color:#000000;"| Big Ten Women's tournament

|-
!colspan=9 style="background:#CC0000; color:#000000;"| WNIT

Rankings

See also
2015–16 Rutgers Scarlet Knights men's basketball team

References

Rutgers Scarlet Knights women's basketball seasons
Rutgers
2016 Women's National Invitation Tournament participants
Scarlet
Scarlet